Vidak Bratić (born 20 October 1976) is a Serbian professional football coach and a former player who played as a defender. He is an assistant coach with Radnički Niš. He lastly spent four seasons with Spartak Subotica, before retiring in the summer of 2013. Previously, Bratić represented numerous clubs in his country and abroad, most notably Vojvodina and PAOK.

Statistics

Honours
Red Star Belgrade
 FR Yugoslavia Cup: 2001–02

External links
 
 

Association football defenders
Chinese Super League players
Expatriate footballers in China
Expatriate footballers in Greece
Expatriate footballers in Russia
Expatriate footballers in Switzerland
FC Dynamo Moscow players
FC St. Gallen players
FC Wil players
First League of Serbia and Montenegro players
FK Spartak Subotica players
FK Vojvodina players
OFK Beograd players
PAOK FC players
Red Star Belgrade footballers
Russian Premier League players
Serbian expatriate footballers
Serbian expatriate sportspeople in China
Serbian expatriate sportspeople in Greece
Serbian expatriate sportspeople in Russia
Serbian expatriate sportspeople in Switzerland
Serbian footballers
Serbian football managers
Serbian SuperLiga players
Sportspeople from Subotica
Super League Greece players
Swiss Challenge League players
Swiss Super League players
Tianjin Jinmen Tiger F.C. players
1976 births
Living people